"Takin' It Easy" is a song co-written and recorded by American country music artist Lacy J. Dalton. It was released in July 1981 as the first single and title track from the album Takin' It Easy.  The song reached number 2 on the Billboard Hot Country Singles & Tracks chart, making it the highest-charting single of Dalton's career.  The song was written by Dalton, Billy Sherrill and Mark Sherrill.

Chart performance

References

1981 singles
1981 songs
Lacy J. Dalton songs
Songs written by Billy Sherrill
Song recordings produced by Billy Sherrill
Columbia Records singles
Songs written by Lacy J. Dalton
Songs written by Mark Sherrill